SMS Ulan was the second ship of the s, serving the Austro-Hungarian Navy from the beginning of the 20th century and World War I. She survived the war and was handed over to Greece afterwards. She served in the Greek fleet under the name of Smyrni until 1932 or 1928, when it was withdrawn from service and scrapped.

Operational history
Shortly after the outbreak of World War I, Ulan took part in August 1914 in the blockade of the Montenegrin coast. The commander was initially Kapitänleutnant Egon Panfilli. On 16 August 1914, the ship patrolled there with the cruiser  and were surprised by an Allied fleet. Under the orders of the Zentas commander, Captain Paul Pachner, Ulan managed to escape the ensuing battle.

On the night of 2 March 1915, Ulan took part in an expedition to the port of Antivari (along with her sisters Csikós and Streiter and torpedo boats 57T, 66F and 67F), which ended with shelling and laying mines at the port and the destruction of the Montenegrin royal yacht .

References

1906 ships
Destroyers of the Austro-Hungarian Navy